The  was held on 6 February 1988 in Kannai Hall, Yokohama, Kanagawa, Japan.

Awards
 Best Film: The Emperor's Naked Army Marches On
 Best Actor: Saburō Tokitō – Eien no 1/2
 Best Actress: Yasuko Tomita – Bu Su
 Best New Actress:
Asako Kobayashi – 
Michiru Akiyoshi – Hikaru onna
Yasuyo Shirashima – 
 Best Supporting Actor: Sabu Kawahara – 
 Best Supporting Actress: Eri Ishida – Chōchin
 Best Director:
Shunichi Kajima – Chōchin
Kazuo Hara – The Emperor's Naked Army Marches On
 Best New Director: Chisho Itoh – Gondola
 Best Screenplay: Hiroshi Saito – Honba Joshikō Manual: Hatsukoi Binetsu-hen, Itoshino Half Moon
 Best Cinematography: Toshihiko Uryū – Gondola
 Special Jury Prize: Chōchin – For the staff.
 Special Prize: Kensaku Morita (Career)

Best 10
 The Emperor's Naked Army Marches On
 Bu Su
 Totto Channel
 Eien no 1/2
 Chōchin
 Koibito Tachi no Jikoku
 Koisuru Onnatachi
 Honba Joshikō Manual: Hatsukoi Binetsu-hen
 Hikaru Onna
 Gondola
runner-up. Make Up

References

Yokohama Film Festival
Yokohama Film Festival
Yokohama Film Festival
Yokohama Film Festival